Pir Ali (also Romanized as Pīr ‘Alī; also known as Emāmzādeh Pīr ‘Alī and Pīr ‘Al) is a village in Miankuh-e Moguyi Rural District, in the Central District of Kuhrang County, Chaharmahal and Bakhtiari Province, Iran. At the 2006 census, its population was 47, in 11 families. The village is populated by Lurs.

References 

Populated places in Kuhrang County
Luri settlements in Chaharmahal and Bakhtiari Province